
Deeds of King Stephen or Acts of Stephen or Gesta Regis Stephani is a mid-12th-century English history by an anonymous author about King Stephen of England and his struggles with his cousin, Empress Matilda, also known as the "Empress Maud".  It is one of the main sources for this period in the history of England.

Some historians think the author may have been Robert of Bath (also known as Robert of Lewes), Bishop of Bath from 1136 to 1166.

The Gesta Stephani was first published in Paris in 1619, from a manuscript in the episcopal library at Laon which was subsequently lost. A fuller manuscript has recently been found, and since published, in the Municipal Library at Valenciennes, having been transferred from the nearby abbey of Vicoigne. The Latin text tells in 120 chapters of the Anarchy of King Stephen's reign, and ends with the accession of King Henry II.

Background and authorship 

The Gesta Stephani was written in two books and historian R.H.C. Davis believes that the first twelve years of Stephen's reign—which comprise book I—were written in about 1148, while the subsequent account, taken up to the accession of Henry II, was written after 1153. Davis examined the places named in the texts and found that most of them were in the South-West of England; unusually detailed descriptions of Bristol and Bath, as well as scornful comments about the former, suggest that the author may have been writing in or near Bath. This contrasts with an earlier statement by K.R. Potter that there is "no clear indication of any local attachment". However, Davis points out that comparisons with the chronicles of other writers based elsewhere in the country reveal considerable south-west bias in the Gesta, which had been overlooked by historians who compared it only with the account of William of Malmesbury, who was also writing in the south-west.

The authorship of the Gesta is not known. According to Richard Howlett, writing in 1886, the author was not from a monastery, and Davis agreed with this in his analysis of the author, because, while he does show a local bias, his knowledge of Exeter, London, Pevensey and Bedford all show that he was a man who travelled. Nonetheless, he was not an itinerant, and his writing reveals little knowledge of the north or East of England or the leading baronial families in those parts of the kingdom, while he placed too much emphasis on the exploits of relatively minor barons associated with the south west, including the de Tracy family. The writer appears to have been a scholar, and his work omits dates and extraneous detail for the sake of literary effect, while employing classical terms to offices and positions rather than their Mediaeval Latin equivalents. Scholars agree that he was a supporter of Henry of Blois, Bishop of Winchester. However, historians differ over their exact relationship: Howlett suggested the author was Henry's chaplain, but Davis believes that the criticism he gave to Henry in the Gesta makes this unlikely. Davis instead suggests that he was a bishop, based on his style of writing, his perspectives on the events he writes about and the places he visited; he goes further to speculate that it may have been Robert of Lewes, Bishop of Bath, who was the author. Robert Bartlett states that he was "perhaps" the author and Hushcroft writes that it was written either by him "or someone close to him".

Manuscripts 

Two manuscripts of the Gesta Stephani have been known to scholars, but one is now lost. The first, housed in the episcopal library at Laon, was printed in the seventeenth century, but subsequently disappeared. It stopped at 1147, was damaged, with some pages illegible, and included gaps in the text. The second manuscript was discovered in the Municipal Library at Valenciennes and was originally from the Abbey of Vicoigne; it includes all of the original manuscript's content, but carries on the work until the end of Stephen's reign and is legible where the original one was damaged. It contains the same four gaps as the first but, where pages appear to be missing in the first, the second manuscript includes gaps in the text, which leads R.A.B. Mynors to suggest that second was copied from the first.

Publication 
A manuscript of the Gesta Stephani was discovered in the libraries of the bishop of Laon in the early seventeenth century, and was first printed in 1619 at Paris by the French historian André Duchesne (1584–1640) in Historia Normannorum Scriptores Antiqui. It was incomplete at that time, and was lost after Duchesne's death. This text was reprinted in England by R.C. Sewell (1803–1864) in 1846 and by Richard Howlett (1841–1917) in 1886; the latter has been praised for its improvements to Duchesne's version and its useful preface. There have been two translations of the work into English, the first being by Thomas Forester in Henry of Huntingdon in 1853 and then second by Joseph Stevenson (1806–1895) in The Church Historians of England in 1858.

Another manuscript was discovered in the Municipal Library, Valenciennes, by Professor R.A.B. Mynors (1903–1989), who found it included with a version of the Gesta Regum by William of Malmesbury, catalogued in the library as MS 792. This new text continued the history of Stephen's reign up to 1154 and filled in the damaged passages which Duchesne was unable to transcribe. In 1955, this version was translated by K.R. Potter and published by Nelson's Mediaeval Texts, with an essay assessing it written by Dr A.L. Poole (1889–1963). It was reprinted in 1976 by Oxford University Press and included a new introduction by R.H.C. Davis (1918–1991), with contributions by Mynors.

Editions 

 Duchesne, André, ed. (1619). Historia Normannorum Scriptores Antiqui. Paris. OCLC 461091103.
 Sewell, Richard Clarke, ed. (1846). Gesta Stephani. London: English Historical Society. OCLC 2200275.
 Forester, Thomas, ed. (trans.) (1853). The Chronicle of Henry of Huntingdon ... also, the Acts of King Stephen. London: Henry G. Bohn. OCLC 16745036.
 Howlett, Richard, ed. (1886). Chronicles of the Reigns of Stephen, Henry II and Richard I. Rolls series, iii.
 Potter, K.R. (trans.), ed. (1955). Gesta Stephani. London: Thomas Nelson & Sons. OCLC 504607315.
 Potter, K.R. (trans.), ed., Davis, R.H.C. (intro.) (1976). Gesta Stephani. Oxford: Oxford University Press. .

See also 
 English historians in the Middle Ages

Notes

References

Citations

Sources 

 Gesta Stephani, edited and translated by K.R. Potter Oxford: Oxford University Press, 1976; . Latin text with facing-page English translation, with introduction and notes by R. H. C. Davis
 British History Online Bishops of Bath and Wells accessed on September 23, 2007
 Huscroft, Richard Ruling England 1042-1217 London: Pearson Longman, 2005; .
 Davis, R.H.C. (1962) "The Authorship of the Gesta Stephani." The English Historical Review 77: 303, 209–232.

External links 
 Latin Chroniclers from the Eleventh to the Thirteenth Centuries: Gesta Stephani from The Cambridge History of English and American Literature, Volume I, 1907–21.

English chronicles
12th-century history books
12th-century Latin books
Latin historical texts from Norman and Angevin England
Stephen, King of England